United Nations Security Council Resolution 1891 was unanimously adopted on 13 October 2009.

Resolution 
Stressing its continuing commitment to peace throughout Sudan, including the still-violent Western Darfur region, the Security Council this morning extended the mandate of the Panel of Experts that helps monitor the arms embargo and sanctions on those who impede peace in the country, for the year ending 15 October 2010.

Through the unanimous adoption of resolution 1891 (2009), the Council also urged all States and other interested parties to supply any information at their disposal on the implementation of the embargo and the sanctions, which includes a travel ban and asset freeze on targeted individuals and organizations. It requested the Panel to coordinate its activities with the operations of the African Union-United Nations Hybrid Operation in Darfur (UNAMID) and to assess progress towards removing impediments to the political process, threats to stability and violations of Security Council resolutions.

See also 
List of United Nations Security Council Resolutions 1801 to 1900 (2008–2009)

References

External links
 
Text of the Resolution at undocs.org

 1891
 1891
October 2009 events
2009 in Sudan